This is the list of presidents of Aquitaine since 1974. Regional legislatures are directly elected since 1986.

Politics of Aquitaine
Lists of French politicians